Ricard Cardús González (born 18 March 1988) is a Grand Prix motorcycle racer from Spain. He is the nephew of Carlos Cardús. He is a former competitor of the Spanish 125GP Championship and the Spanish Supersport Championship. He is currently the test rider for the KTM Moto2 project alongside competing in the FIM CEV Moto2 European Championship aboard a Kalex Moto2.

Career statistics

FIM CEV Moto2 European Championship

Races by year
(key)

Grand Prix motorcycle racing

By season

Races by year
(key)

References

External links

125cc World Championship riders
Moto2 World Championship riders
Spanish motorcycle racers
1988 births
Living people
Sportspeople from Barcelona